William Thomas Hall, better known as Tommy Hall, (born October–December 1876 – 26 April 1949) was an English professional track racing cyclist.

Biography
Born in Croydon, London, Hall was a professional cyclist between 1900 and 1914.

Hall broke the world motor-paced hour record in 1903, completing 54.34 miles (87.391 kilometres). He won the first London Six Day race, partnered with fellow Brit Martin, covering 839 miles in 36 hours. He also came third in the European stayer (motor-paced) championship in 1904.

During the 1901 census, Hall was 24, living with his family at 104 Shepherd's Bush Road, London, his occupation was listed as cycle maker. His father, Nathaniel Hall, was a furniture retailer.

Hall died aged 72 in 1949, his grave lies in Abney Park Cemetery in Stoke Newington, London, a few feet away from the statue of Dr Isaac Watts. The headstone inscription reads:

.  
His body was found on 26 April but he was last seen alive on 14 April 1949; his last address given as 40 Sotheby Road, Highbury.

References

External links
Photos of Tommy Hall and other cyclists
Tommy Hall archive

1876 births
1949 deaths
English male cyclists
People from Croydon
Burials at Abney Park Cemetery